Christopher "Chris" Robert Ineson (born 4 January 1945 in Cheltenham, United Kingdom) is a former field hockey player from New Zealand, who competed with the national team at the 1972 Summer Olympics in Munich.

His younger brother Tony represented The Kiwi's four years later, when the team surprisingly won the gold medal at the 1976 Summer Olympics in Montreal.

References

External links
 

New Zealand male field hockey players
Olympic field hockey players of New Zealand
Field hockey players at the 1972 Summer Olympics
1945 births
Living people